Juan Antonio Nuño Montes (27 March 1927 - 5 May 1995) was a philosopher, writer and university professor.

After leaving Spain in 1947, Nuño settled in Venezuela where he studied philosophy at the Central University of Venezuela. In 1951 he studied at the University of Cambridge and the University of Paris. In 1962 he finished his doctoral degree under Juan David García Bacca at the Central University of Venezuela and spent a year in Switzerland studying with Józef Maria Bocheński. He was the chair of the Instituto de Filosofía de la UCV from 1975 to 1979. In 1976 he became a member of the International Institute of Philosophy of Unesco (París). He taught at the Universidad Complutense, University of Barcelona, University of Puerto Rico, Rio Piedras Campus, San Marcos University and the UNAM, where he founded the journal Crítica of the Instituto de investigaciones Filosóficas.

Works
La filosofía en Borges (México: FCE, 1986) 
El pensamiento de Platón (México, FCE 2007) 
Los mitos filosóficos (México: Fondo de Cultura Económica, 1985)
Sionismo, marxismo, antisemitismo : la cuestión judía revisitada (Caracas: Monte Ávila, 1987) 
 La veneración de las astucias (Caracas: Monte Ávila, 1989)
La escuela de la sospecha: Nuevos ensayos polémicos (Caracas: Monte Avila, 1990) 
 Fin de siglo (México: Fondo de Cultura Económica, 1991)
 Escuchar con los ojos (Caracas: Monte Avila, 1993) 
 Ética y. cibernética: ensayos filosóficos (Caracas: Monte Ávila Latinoamericana, 1994)

External links
Nuño's Essays
Biography at Venezuela Tuya

1927 births
1995 deaths
Academic staff of the Central University of Venezuela
Central University of Venezuela alumni
Venezuelan male writers
Spanish emigrants to Venezuela
Venezuelan philosophers
20th-century Spanish philosophers
Death in Caracas